Côtes-du-Rhône Villages is a French wine Appellation d'Origine Contrôlée (AOC) in the southern Rhône wine region of France. Red, white and rosé wine are all produced within the appellation. The quality is superior to the generic Côtes-du-Rhône AOC, but below more specific appellations such as Châteauneuf-du-Pape AOC and Vacqueyras AOC. Côtes-du-Rhône Villages is the second largest appellation in the Rhône, only surpassed in size by Côtes-du-Rhône AOC.

History 
Côtes-du-Rhône-Villages was established as AOC in 1966-1967 though drafts originated from as early as 1953. Five communes stood out, Cairanne, Gigondas (both now appellations in themselves), Chusclan, Laudun and Saint-Maurice-sur-Eygues. These communes or villages were allowed to put their name on the label in exchange of submitting to a number of regulations, such as a minimum alcohol level (12.5%). In 1955 Vacqueyras was accepted in the small group and two years later, Vinsobres.
The inspiration for the appellation was found in Beaujolais, which also has a village-level of wine. Since, the appellation has expanded to almost 10,000 hectares, half of which can add the name of the village to the label. The other half can distinguish themselves from Côtes-du-Rhône by merely adding the "village".

Villages

Côtes du Rhône Villages
With a total of approximately 2,211 hectares under cultivation for Côtes du Rhône Villages, the average yield is approximately 38 hectoliters per hectare. Producers are required to adhere to stricter wine growing and wine making rules than those prescribed for Côtes du Rhône.
A maximum of 20% of other authorized varieties is permitted.
The rosés must contain a minimum of 50% Grenache with 20% of Syrah and/or Morvèdre and a maximum of 20% of other authorised varieties to comprise not more than 20% of white varieties. Used are Grenache, Clairette, Marsanne, Rousanne, Bouboulenc and Viognier.
The white wines are a blend of Grenache white, Clairette white, Marsanne white, Rousanne white, Bourboulenc white and Viognier. Other varieties are allowed to a maximum of 20%.
The minimum required alcoholic strength is fixed at 12% for all three colours.

Côtes du Rhône Villages + village names

Under stricter requirements than for the Côtes du Rhône Villages, twenty of the communes of the appellation are authorized to append their respective village name on the label. With around 5,500 hectares under cultivation, the average yield is approximately 37 hectoliters per hectare. The minimum required alcoholic strength is fixed at 12.5% for the reds and 12% for the whites and rosés.

Rousset-les-Vignes - The northernmost of the 20 named villages. Though wine has been made here since the 15th century it is not a very famous village. 58 ha of wine is being grown here yielding 2500 hl. The village was added to the named-villages-list in 1969 and its stoney vineyards are located at 400 m. altitude making it a village with a somewhat cooler temperature range than those villages at lower altitudes.

Saint-Pantaléon-les-Vignes - Just three km south of Rousset-les-Vignes, Saint-Pantaléon-les-Vignes shares both its terroir and history - even in size they are alike, this one being 63 ha producing 2665 hl. As a curiosity, every year a ceremony is held in the village, where the oldest and the youngest wine producer, along with the village's administration, decide when to begin harvesting.

Valréas - Another 5 km to the south we find this village. While the church historically has had an affinity for Valréas, there are few remarkable wines from here. The village covers 273 ha. and produces 11,390 hl.

Visan - 9 km. south-south-east of Valréas we find this village. Medium-sized with 390 ha. of fat clay soil and an average production of 16,050 hl. Few Visan wines attract attention.

Saint-Maurice - The placement between the villages of Valréas and Rasteau seems to be the main reason why this village was raised to Village-status. 170 ha. of sandy, chalky soil yields 6,690 hl. of wine. Few attract attention but the emergence of Domaine Viret has caused some interest.

Rochegude - The village was allegedly established during the reign of emperor Domitian (51-96) and Jefferson is said to have presented wines from here to Washington himself! Today, the 178 ha. located at 100 m. altitude produces 6,618 hl. of wine of little repute.

Roaix - The same can be said about Roaix despite its location between Rasteau and Cairanne. The 89 ha. are stoney and red clay and yield 3,550 hl. Historically the wine fetched high prices but no one seems to have developed the historical and geographical potential.

Cairanne - This place has been inhabited for more than 4000 years. In the 15th century ca. 40 ha. of vines was planted - today the number is 765, yielding 30,600 hl. wine - some of the best in all of Côtes-du-Rhône-Village. Thus most of the Cairanne vineyards have been provisionally elevated to AOC status in February 2016 and definitively in June 2018, so Cairanne is no longer a Denomination under the Côtes-du-Rhône-Village appellation.

Séguret - This mountain village is located on the eastern side of the river Oèveze. It is ancient regarding wine as Pliny the Elder mentions it in his natural history. However it is only recently that the 220 ha. of the appellation has attracted attention. The terroir is interesting - chalk at altitude (near the Dentelles de Montmirail), resulting in fine wines from the independent producers.

Sablet - 180 ha. near Gigondas and Séguret, mainly sand (from which the village derives its name). The village produces ca. 7,200 hl. of which the cooperative produces det bulk.

Saint-Gervais - Covers 103 ha. and became a named village in 1974. Placed to the west of the Rhône-river to the department Gard, the climate is cooled slightly. However the river-facing vineyards are exposed to both heat and extreme winds. The local cooperative handles most of the 4315 hl. the village produces. As early as 1789 the marquis de Guasc made his own wine in the region, a role model for independent producers.

Chusclan - Wine in Chusclan has been produced by both Roman legionaries and Benedictine monks and it was served at royal tables. With this kind of history, one would expect a high level of quality from the 150 ha. However little is to be found.

Laudun - Like Chusclan, Laudun has history on its side, being centered around ancient vineyards, established around 300-200 BC, and in 1375 wines from here were sent to the pope in Avignon. Later, in 1561, the wine was exported to Rome and when Louis XIII visited he tasted the white wine of Laudun. While it was the white wine that was famous it's hardly produced at all today. Covering 350 ha. the wines are delightful if lagging behind their historical pedigree.

Massif d'Uchaux, Plan de Dieu, Puyméras, and Signargues - have been included in the 2011 edition of the regulation.

Gadagne - has been added in 2012, while Sainte-Cécile, Suze-la-Rousse and Vaison-la-Romaine have been included in 2016.

Grape varieties

A large number of varieties are allowed in the Côtes du Rhône Villages AOC. The allowed grape varieties, by colour of the wine, are indicated below. Main grape varieties for the respective color are indicated by "M", supplementary varieties (not designated for white wines) by "S", and accessory varieties by "(A)".

The rules for the proportion of main, supplementary and accessory grape varieties are the following:
 White wines: a minimum of 80% of the main grape varieties.
 Red and rosé wines:
 The main grape variety (Grenache noir) must make up at least 50%.
 The supplementary grape varieties Syrah and Mourvèdre together must make up at least 20% of the blend.
 The main and supplementary grape varieties must together make up at least 80% of the blend.
 The accessory grape varieties are restricted to a maximum of 20% of the blend.

In contrast to Côtes du Rhône without the Village designation, the variety Marselan variety may not be used, the proportion of accessory grapes is restricted to 20% rather than 30%, and Blanc and Rosé varieties are not allowed at all in the red wines.

References

Rhône wine AOCs
1966 establishments in France